Anadoras is a genus of thorny catfishes native to tropical South America.

This genus has been assigned to the subfamily Astrodoradinae.

Species 
There are currently four recognized species in this genus:
 Anadoras grypus (Cope, 1872)
 Anadoras insculptus (A. Miranda-Ribeiro, 1912) (of uncertain affinities, may belong here or in Amblydoras)
 Anadoras regani (Steindachner, 1908)
 Anadoras weddellii (Castelnau, 1855)

References

Doradidae
Fish of South America
Fish of the Amazon basin
Taxa named by Carl H. Eigenmann
Freshwater fish genera